Panjaa is a 2011 Indian Telugu-language action film directed by Vishnuvardhan and produced by Arka Media Works and Sanghamitra Art Productions. The film stars Pawan Kalyan, Sarah-Jane Dias, Anjali Lavania, Jackie Shroff, Adivi Sesh and Atul Kulkarni. The plot follows Jaidev, a gangster's loyal henchman who is forced to go on the run following a botched mission and killing his boss's son for committing a violent atrocity.

The film features music scored by Yuvan Shankar Raja and cinematography by P. S. Vinod. The film marks Dias' debut in Telugu cinema and Lavania's film debut. Vishnuvardhan, who works primarily in the Tamil cinema, also makes his directorial debut in Telugu.

Principal photography of the film commenced on  6 May 2011. The filming took place primarily at Kolkata, Pollachi, Karaikudi, Vagamon and Palasa. Panjaa was released theatrically on 9 December 2011.

Upon release, it received mixed-to-negative reviews from both the critics and audience, alike. The performances (especially of Sesh's and Shroff's), songs, cinematography, action sequences, and production design were praised. However, the direction, story, screenplay, background score, and pace were highly criticized.

Initially deemed as a little ahead of its time, over the years, it became a huge cult film and is now considered to be an underrated Telugu film, of the recent times. The film performed well in overseas, but failed hugely, at the Indian box office.

Plot
Jaidev is a Kolkata-based hitman working for a don named Bhagavan, and they together share a business rivalry with Kulkarni. When Bhagavan's psychotic son Munna returns to India after 8 years, he mistreats the accountant Sabapathy and humiliates him. Receiving no support from Bhagavan, Sabapathy joins Kulkarni's gang, making Bhagavan order Jai to kill him. As per the plan, Jai kidnaps Rahul, the son of Kulkarni's brother Sampath. He asks Guruvayya to hold Rahul hostage at a club until he is back with Sabapathy. Jai demands a meeting with Sabapathy in exchange for Rahul's freedom. Sabapathy tells him he switched sides not to retaliate, but to protect himself. Munna, on the other hand, visits the club and is attracted to club dancer named Jhanvi and inquires about her in the club. Learning from Guruvayya that she loves Jai, Munna is enraged and kills Rahul after he teases him for being an incel and kills Kulkarni's henchman, who came to pick up Rahul.

When Sampath and Kulkarni receive no response, Jai tries to escape, and a chase ensues. He manages to flee but is shocked to learn of Rahul's death. Munna finds Jahnavi at Jai's house and beats her to death. Jai arrives and gets into a fight with Munna. Guruvayya sees Jai kill Munna and reports him to Bhagavan. Jai decides to tell Bhagavan the reason behind killing Munna, and is on his way attacked by the henchmen as per Bhagavan's orders. Following a gunfight, Jai escapes while Bhagavan vows to seek revenge for Munna's death. Jai escapes to Palasa, where he stays at his love interest Sandhya's house. On the other hand, the rivalry between Bhagavan and Kulkarni intensifies after Jai's exit as Bhagavan loses power and his trusted men join hands with Kulkarni. Bhagavan learns about Jai's nursery he used to run with the help of his friend Chotu, and gets it destroyed by his men upon learning about Chotu.

Back at Palasa, some goons invade their home at night, Ashok and Jai together fight them off, following which Sandhya reveals about a mercenary named Sambasiva, who was after her life since she sent him to prison. Jai kills Sambasiva and gives the credit to a cop named Paparayudu. Bhagavan learns about Chotu's location through his girlfriend, kills her, and captures Chotu. He finds out about Jai and Sandhya through a photo from Chotu's phone. When Chotu refuses to tell anything about Jai, Bhagavan gets him asphyxiated. Jai reveals to Sandhya that he was the one who killed Sambasiva for her, further revealing about his past. Jai is soon attacked by Sampath and his henchmen, but Ashok arrives to his rescue. Following a gunfight and a brawl, Jai kills Sampath and learns Sandhya has been kidnapped. Jai goes back to Kolkata and attacks Kulkarni's house, where he kills his henchmen and holds Kulkarni on gunpoint. Kulkarni tells him he hasn't kidnapped Sandhya, and it was Guruvayya who told them about Jai's location. Jai proceeds to first kill Kulkarni and then Guruvayya, following which he arrives at Bhagavan's house and finds Sandhya held captive. Jai reveals why he killed Munna and tries to convince Bhagavan into sparing Sandhya. However, Bhagavan ends up shooting her, and Jai ends up shooting Bhagavan. Sandhya survives and unites with Jai, but Bhagavan dies from his injuries.

Cast

 Pawan Kalyan as Jaidev
 Sarah-Jane Dias as Sandhya
 Anjali Lavania as Jahnavi
 Jackie Shroff as Bhagavan
 Adivi Sesh as Munna, Bhagavan's son
 Atul Kulkarni as Kulkarni
 Brahmanandam as Paparayudu
 Tanikella Bharani as Guruvayya
 Ali as Chotu
 Subbaraju as Ashok, Sandhya's brother
 Sampath Raj as Sampath, Kulkarni's brother
 Amit Tiwari as Goon
 Paruchuri Venkateswara Rao as Sabhapathi
 Surekha Vani as Jaidev's mother
 Jhansi as Lakshmi
 Kishori Ballal as Sandhya's grandmother

Production

Development
In November 2010, sources reported that director Vishnuvardhan would direct a film featuring Pawan Kalyan in the lead role, to be produced by Neelima Nagesh and Shobu Yarlagadda. Neelima, in an interview, stated that she was a big fan of Pawan Kalyan. Vishnnuvardhan, following the release of his 2009 film Sarvam, which fared poorly at the box office, had been working on two scripts – the other one being the prequel to the 2007 version of Billa – but was unable to start either project due to unavailable dates of Pawan Kalyan and Ajith Kumar. He had planned to shoot both projects simultaneously from March 2011 onwards, but since that was not possible, he was forced to drop one of the projects, with Vishnuvardhan eventually deciding to direct this film. Abburi Ravi was roped in to write the dialogues, while the screenplay was provided by Rahul Koda.

Casting
Former Miss India Sarah-Jane Dias was signed for one of the two female lead characters, making her Telugu film debut. Jiah Khan and Shazahn Padamsee, who starred in Orange opposite Ram Charan Tej, were considered for the other female role. However, eventually Mumbai-based model Anjali Lavania, best known for her appearances in the Kingfisher calendar and several other advertisements, was finalised for the second character. Director-actor Sesh Adivi was roped in for an antagonist role. Yuvan Shankar Raja and A. Sreekar Prasad, Vishnuvardhan's norm associates, were signed to score the music and handle the editing department, respectively, while P. S. Vinod was selected as the cinematographer in place of Nirav Shah who had worked on Vishnuvardhan's previous projects. Action sequences were choreographed by Sham Kaushal, a noted stunt co-ordinator in Bollywood films, while Sunil Babu was chosen as the art director. Vishnuvardhan's wife, Anu Vardhan, worked as the costume designer.

Filming
Principal photography was expected to start from 15 April 2011, with the scenes during the first schedule being shot in Kolkata, West Bengal. Filming eventually began on 6 May in Kolkata, where the major part of the film was shot. The Kolkata schedule was completed by late June 2011, and the following month, filming was held in Pollachi, Tamil Nadu, which was followed by schedules in Karaikudi, Tamil Nadu and across Kerala. In Kerala, the crew shot for five days at the Vagamon hill station, located 1,100 metres above sea level. A song sequence featuring Pawan Kalyan and Sarah Jane was shot at the Ramoji Film City in Hyderabad in September under the choreography of Firoz Khan. From 10 October, the last song picturised on Anjali Lavania was canned in a Hyderabad studio. Anjali performed belly dance in the song, which was choreographed by Geeta Kapoor, best known for her work in the song Sheila Ki Jawani from the Hindi film Tees Maar Khan.

The film was launched under the working title The Shadow, with the team indicating that the title may be changed. The film, began its principal photography in early May 2011, which was completed by October 2011, with filming being held primarily at Kolkata, West Bengal, Pollachi and Karaikudi in Tamil Nadu and Vagamon in Kerala apart from Palasa. In the following months, several titles including Kaali, Thilak, Power and Patel, were considered. The official title was revealed as Panjaa by the producers during Dussera.

Soundtrack 

For the film's score and soundtrack, Vishnuvardhan's friend and usual associate, Yuvan Shankar Raja, was signed up. Panjaa'''s soundtrack features six tracks. Chandrabose and Ramajogayya Sastry penned the lyrics for every three songs. The composing began in late January 2011. The soundtrack album was originally planned to be launched on 6 November 2011 but was postponed due to the sudden demise of Yuvan Shankar Raja's mother. The audio launch was held on 18 November 2011 in a grand manner at the Gachibowli Indoor Stadium in Hyderabad. Along with the cast and crew, noted film personalities including directors K. Raghavendra Rao and S. S. Rajamouli, composer M. M. Keeravani and actor Rana Daggubati attended the function, which was anchored by comedian Ali and Suma Kanakala. The event was broadcast live on MAA TV.

Upon release, the songs generally garnered positive response. The songs became chartbusters, with the title track Panjaa becoming the most played song in all Hyderabad radio channels, as well as the song of the year. 123Telugu gave a positive response stating "Pawan Kalyan has tried out a new look for this movie and the buzz in the industry is that ‘Panjaa’ is going to be very different from his earlier flicks. The audio album reflects this. Yuvan's music is very different and modern. There are some pretty good numbers in this album. The title track ‘Panjaa’ absolutely rocks. ‘Ela Ela’ and ‘Paparayudu’ will be quite popular too. A better item number would have been a major asset. Do not expect a regular Pawan Kalyan style audio album this time. Listen to this album with an open mind and you will appreciate the music." In 2013, the film's music director Yuvan Shankar Raja reused the background score in the Tamil-language film Ameerin Aadhi-Bhagavan. 

 Marketing and release 
Prior to its release, the film's official merchandise was made available on the official site, including a game application. 15% of the merchandise sales were donated to major NGOs. An anti-piracy initiative was also launched through the site itself. The film's official merchandise was also released across Andhra Pradesh. A teaser trailer was released a day prior to Diwali, which received a high response. According to Sify, it was seen more than 200,000 times on the film's official YouTube channel within 24 hours, setting a new record.

In order to prevent any major cuts, the makers accepted the A (adults only) rating from the Central Board of Film Certification for their release in India, while they actually wanted the U/A (parental guidance) rating. The film was released on 9 December 2011 with six cuts. Following multiple fan requests, the makers added the title track in the beginning as well, while it initially played only during the end.

In 2012, the film was released on DVD and Blu-ray formats by Bhavani DVD. The same year, a Tamil-dubbed version titled Kuri was also scheduled to release, but the plan was later on dropped. In 2015, a Hindi-dubbed version titled Jaandaar was released. The film was also dubbed in Malayalam as Paayum.

 Reception 

Critical reception
Panjaa received largely, mixed-to-negative reviews,  from the critics. Fullhyd gave it 3.5 stars out of 5, praising the film's technical aspects and performances while criticizing the dubbing for both the heroines. 123Telugu gave it 3 stars out of 5, praising the performances and action sequences while also criticizing the second half and lack of lengthy song sequences. Idlebrain.com also gave it 3 stars out of 5, similarly praising the action sequences and performances apart from technical aspects, but criticized the lack of emotions. News18 praised the film's art work and styling, but criticized the narration pace.

On the other hand, Rediff gave 2 stars, criticizing the script and pointing out that it reminded of Kalyan's earlier film Balu ABCDEFG but praised Sesh's performance Greatandhra'' also gave it 2 stars, criticizing the lack of a "major conflict point". Oneindia.in criticized the film but praised Kalyan's performance, cinematography and the music.

References

External links
 
 

2011 films
2010s Telugu-language films
2011 action drama films
2011 action thriller films
2011 crime action films
Indian action drama films
Indian action thriller films
Indian crime action films
Films shot in Kolkata
Films shot in Tamil Nadu
Films about orphans
Indian films about revenge
Films directed by Vishnuvardhan (director)
Films scored by Yuvan Shankar Raja
Films shot in Kerala
Gun fu films
Films shot in Hyderabad, India
Films shot at Ramoji Film City
Films shot in Andhra Pradesh
Films set in Andhra Pradesh
Films set in West Bengal
Films set in Kolkata